Chrysochraon dispar is a species belonging to the family Acrididae subfamily Gomphocerinae.  It is found across the Palearctic east to Siberia.

References

Orthoptera of Europe
Insects described in 1831
Gomphocerinae